Margaret Ashcroft (16 February 1931 – 25 October 2016) was a British television actress. She played the role of Margaret Castleton in the ITV series The Main Chance between 1969 and 1975 and the role of Gwen Riley in The Brothers between 1974 and 1976.

In 1953, Ashcroft married British actor Morris Perry, and they remained married until her death in 2016. She was survived by Perry and their four children.

Selected television appearances
 The Brothers
 Van der Valk
 Doomwatch
 The Main Chance
 McCallum
 Armchair Theatre

References

External links
 

British television actresses
1931 births
2016 deaths
People from Chelsea, London
Actresses from London
20th-century English actresses
21st-century English actresses
English stage actresses